Mickaël Bessaque (born 23 October 1975), is a French former footballer and football manager, most recently head coach at Montluçon.

Club career
Spending his entire career in the lower division of France, Bessaque played one full season in Ligue 2 with Rouen.

Managerial career
Having managed lower league sides Guérêt and Domerat, Bessaque was manager of Montluçon between 2018 and 2021.

References

1975 births
Living people
French footballers
French football managers
Association football midfielders
Championnat National players
Championnat National 2 players
Ligue 2 players
Stade de Reims players
Louhans-Cuiseaux FC players
Clermont Foot players
FC Rouen players
Rodez AF players
Montluçon Football players